Nikolai Vladimirovich Olenikov (born 24 May 1975) is a Russian association football coach and a former defender. He is an assistant coach with the Under-19 squad of FC Rotor Volgograd.

Honours
 Russian Premier League runner-up: 1997.

International career
Olenikov made his debut for Russia on 21 August 2002 in a friendly against Sweden.

European club competitions
 1997–98 UEFA Cup with FC Rotor Volgograd: 6 games.
 1998–99 UEFA Cup with FC Rotor Volgograd: 2 games.

External links 
  Profile

1975 births
Living people
People from Stavropol Krai
Russian footballers
Russia international footballers
FC Dynamo Stavropol players
FC Rotor Volgograd players
FC Rostov players
FC Sibir Novosibirsk players
Russian Premier League players
FC SKA-Khabarovsk players
Association football defenders
FC Sever Murmansk players
Sportspeople from Stavropol Krai